Thiotricha embolarcha is a moth of the family Gelechiidae. It was described by Edward Meyrick in 1929. It is found on Java in Indonesia.

The wingspan is about 19 mm. The forewings are ochreous whitish partially tinged with fuscous and with the costal edge dark fuscous from the base to the middle. The markings are formed by a light fuscous suffusion mixed with darker fuscous. There is a streak beneath the basal fourth of the costa and some light suffusion in the disc anteriorly, with a spot of darker suffusion resting on the costa before the middle, from this a dark line runs beneath the costa to four-fifths. A dark oblique-triangular blotch occupies the basal two-fifths of the dorsum, from its apex a dark attenuated streak runs to the apical spot. There is a short dash at the tornus, preceded by a small elongate spot on the dorsum, and followed by a wedge-shaped spot on the lower part of the termen, connected with the apical spot in the disc. There is also a dark streak from the costa beyond the middle to the apical spot and a small dark triangular apical spot, including a black apical dot partly edged with white. The hindwings are light grey.

References

Moths described in 1929
Thiotricha
Taxa named by Edward Meyrick